Louise Simard may refer to:
 Louise Simard (writer) (born 1950), author in Quebec, Canada
 Louise Simard (politician) (born 1947), Canadian politician and lawyer